Pop Rocks, also called popping candy, is a candy, owned by Zeta Espacial S.A. Pop Rocks ingredients include sugar, lactose (milk sugar), and flavoring. It differs from typical hard candy in that pressurized carbon dioxide gas bubbles are embedded inside of the candy, creating a small popping reaction when it dissolves.

Background and history
The concept was patented by General Foods research chemists Leon T. Kremzner and William A. Mitchell on December 12, 1961 (U.S. patent #3,012,893), but the candy was not offered to the public until 1976, before General Foods withdrew it in 1983, citing its lack of success in the marketplace and its relatively short shelf life.

Distribution was initially controlled to ensure freshness; but with its increasing popularity, unauthorized redistribution from market to market resulted in out-of-date product reaching consumers. After that, Kraft Foods licensed the Pop Rocks brand  to Zeta Espacial S.A. which continued manufacturing the product under Kraft's license. Eventually, Zeta Espacial S.A. became the brand's owner and sole manufacturer. Pop Rocks is distributed in the U.S. by Pop Rocks Inc. (Atlanta, Georgia) and by Zeta Espacial S.A. (Barcelona, Spain) in the rest of the world. Zeta Espacial S.A. also sells popping candy internationally under other brands including Peta Zetas, Wiz Fizz, and Magic Gum.

In 2008, Marvin J. Rudolph, who led the group assigned to bring Pop Rocks out of the laboratory and into the manufacturing plant, wrote a history of Pop Rocks development.  The book, titled Pop Rocks: The Inside Story of America's Revolutionary Candy, was based on interviews with food technologists, engineers, marketing managers, and members of Billy Mitchell's family, along with the author's experience. In the book, Rudolph points out that the Turkish company HLEKS Popping Candy flooded the market with popping candy in the year 2000.

A similar product, Cosmic Candy, previously called Space Dust, was in powdered form and was also manufactured by General Foods.

In 2012, Cadbury Schweppes Pty. Ltd. (in Australia) began producing a chocolate product named "Marvellous Creations Jelly Popping Candy Beanies" which contains popping candy, jelly beans and beanies (candy covered chocolate). By 2013 Whittakers (New Zealand) had also released a local product (white chocolate with a local carbonated drink Lemon and Paeroa). Prominent British chef Heston Blumenthal has also made several desserts incorporating popping candy, both for the peculiar sensory experience of the popping and for the nostalgia value of using an ingredient popular in the 1970s.

Manufacturing
As described by a 1980 patent, the candy is made by dissolving sugars in water and is evaporated at  until the water content is 3% by mass. The mixture is then kept under pressure and allowed to cool and solidify, embedding the carbon dioxide bubbles in the candy. When the pressure on the cooled and solidified candy is released, it shatters into pieces that vary in size.

Urban legend
Rumors persisted that eating Pop Rocks and drinking soda would cause a person's stomach to boil and explode. This was, in part, caused by the false assumption that Pop Rocks contain an acid/base mixture (such as baking soda and vinegar) which produces large volumes of gas when mixed through chewing and saliva. One of these myths involved child actor John Gilchrist (playing the character Little Mikey in 1970s Life cereal television commercials), who was falsely rumored to have died after consuming excess amounts of Pop Rocks and Coca-Cola.

Though the confection had been extensively tested and found safe, the carbonated candy still alarmed residents in Seattle. The Food and Drug Administration set up a hotline there to assure anxious parents that the fizzing candy would not cause their children to choke.  General Foods was battling the "exploding kid" rumors as early as 1979. General Foods sent letters to school principals, created an open letter to parents, took out advertisements in major publications and sent the confection's inventor on the road to explain that a Pop Rocks package contains less gas (namely, carbon dioxide, the same gas used in all carbonated beverages) than half a can of soda.

Because of the unique flavor of the legend, and the duration of its perpetuation, the story has appeared in many other forms of media and fiction. On the very first episode of MythBusters, Adam Savage and Jamie Hyneman put the Mikey rumor to the test by mixing six packs of Pop Rocks and a six-pack of cola inside a pig's stomach, complete with enough hydrochloric acid to simulate the acid inside a human stomach. Despite the pig stomach growing to three times its initial size, it did not blow up even after time was allotted for digestion. In another stomach used as an experimental counterpart, only a large amount of sodium bicarbonate along with acid and soda (and without any Pop Rocks) was able to cause a gastric rupture. The broadcast included interview clips with Pop Rocks Inc. vice president Fernando Arguis explaining the candy and the myth, and Savage later alluded to the myth at a presentation at Rensselaer Polytechnic Institute by showing that Pop Rocks and soda—albeit in a smaller amount—in his own stomach was not fatal.

References

External links
 Pop Rocks official web site
 Zeta Espacial S.A.
 General Foods Corporation's U.S. Patent 3,012,893 for the concept behind Pop Rocks
 General Foods Corporation's  for Pop Rocks
 Images of US patent 4289794 for Pop Rocks from the U.S. Patent and Trademark Office
   – book detailing the story of Pop Rocks development to Pop Rocks today

Brand name confectionery
Products introduced in 1975
Patented foods
Candy